The 2002 Florida gubernatorial election took place on November 5, 2002 for the post of Governor of Florida. Incumbent Republican governor Jeb Bush defeated Democratic candidate Bill McBride. Bush became the first  Republican governor of Florida to win re-election to a second term. This election was the last time until 2022 a Florida gubernatorial candidate won the general election by double digits.

Republican nomination
Jeb Bush announced that he would run for re-election in June 2001 after first being elected in 1998. Bush was unopposed for the GOP nomination, and spent the summer amassing a war chest of over $5.6 million towards his re-election campaign.

Democratic primary

Candidates
Daryl Jones, State Senator from Miami
Bill McBride, Tampa attorney
Janet Reno, former United States Attorney General

Withdrew
Lois Frankel, State Representative from West Palm Beach

Campaign
Reno led throughout much of the campaign for the Democratic nomination, boasting name recognition and employing a grassroots strategy. In early June, she led McBride in the polls by a margin of 53%-25%, but trailed in a hypothetical head-to-head against Bush. Reno's primary campaign was dubbed the "Little red pickup truck tour", so-named because she toured the state in her 1999 Ford Ranger. 

Over the summer, Reno's lead dwindled. McBride, backed by big money donors, was able to exploit Reno's paltry war chest, and sometime aloof campaign. Reno's connections to the Clinton Administration, and her handling of both the Waco siege and the Elián González affair were frequent topics in the primary. 

In the final few weeks, McBride narrowed the gap to a dead heat going into the September 10 primary.

Results

McBride won the nomination by less than 4,800 votes.

Aftermath 
Reno disputed the results after the primary was marred by problems. Several areas had technical glitches and delayed openings of the poll especially in Miami-Dade and Broward counties, both of which Reno performed strongly in. As a result of the problems, Governor Bush kept the polls open for two additional hours.

McBride selected Tom Rossin, minority leader of the Florida Senate, as his running mate.

Campaign
McBride's campaign focused on the importance of public education, supporting policies such as  teacher pay rises and less emphasis on standardized tests. McBride was helped towards the end of the campaign by visits from national Democratic figures such as former President Bill Clinton, former Vice President Al Gore and Jesse Jackson. Though McBride himself did not make the topic an issue of his campaign, nationwide Democrats saw the race as an opportunity to avenge Al Gore's controversial loss in Florida during the 2000 presidential election and the subsequent recount. Likewise Republicans saw this race a preview of 2004.

President George W. Bush made numerous visits to Florida to support his brother for re-election. Bush had a strong fundraising advantage over McBride in what was seen as one of the pivotal races in the 2002 midterm elections. Republican adverts targeted McBride as a failed lawyer and as a tax and spender.

The two main candidates faced each other in two debates on 27 September and 22 October in the most expensive Florida gubernatorial election yet. Polls towards the end of the campaign showed Bush with a lead over McBride. Department of Justice observers were stationed at some of the polls, but unlike the problems during the 2000 presidential election and the Democratic primary, voting went smoothly.

At the same time as the election, an initiative was passed to limit class sizes. This had been opposed by Bush due to the cost of implementing it but had been supported by McBride.

Predictions

Polling

Election results

Notes

References

See also

Florida
2002
Gubernatorial
Jeb Bush